In mathematics, particularly in linear algebra, a skew-symmetric (or antisymmetric or antimetric) matrix is a square matrix whose transpose equals its negative. That is, it satisfies the condition

In terms of the entries of the matrix, if  denotes the entry in the -th row and -th column, then the skew-symmetric condition is equivalent to

Example 
The matrix

is skew-symmetric because

Properties 
Throughout, we assume that all matrix entries belong to a field  whose characteristic is not equal to 2. That is, we assume that , where 1 denotes the multiplicative identity and 0 the additive identity of the given field. If the characteristic of the field is 2, then a skew-symmetric matrix is the same thing as a symmetric matrix.

 The sum of two skew-symmetric matrices is skew-symmetric.
 A scalar multiple of a skew-symmetric matrix is skew-symmetric.
 The elements on the diagonal of a skew-symmetric matrix are zero, and therefore its trace equals zero.
 If  is a real skew-symmetric matrix, then  is invertible, where  is the identity matrix.
 If  is a skew-symmetric matrix then  is a symmetric negative semi-definite matrix.

Vector space structure 
As a result of the first two properties above, the set of all skew-symmetric matrices of a fixed size forms a vector space. The space of  skew-symmetric matrices has dimension 

Let  denote the space of  matrices. A skew-symmetric matrix is determined by  scalars (the number of entries above the main diagonal); a symmetric matrix is determined by   scalars (the number of entries on or above the main diagonal). Let  denote the space of  skew-symmetric matrices and  denote the space of  symmetric matrices. If  then

Notice that  and  This is true for every square matrix  with entries from any field whose characteristic is different from 2. Then, since  and  

where  denotes the direct sum.

Denote by  the standard inner product on  The real  matrix  is skew-symmetric if and only if

Since this definition is independent of the choice of basis, skew-symmetry is a property that depends only on the linear operator  and a choice of inner product.

 skew symmetric matrices can be used to represent cross products as matrix multiplications.

Determinant 

Let  be a  skew-symmetric matrix. The determinant of  satisfies

In particular, if  is odd, and since the underlying field is not of characteristic 2, the determinant vanishes. Hence, all odd dimension skew symmetric matrices are singular as their determinants are always zero. This result is called Jacobi’s theorem, after Carl Gustav Jacobi (Eves, 1980).

The even-dimensional case is more interesting.

Thus the determinant of a real skew-symmetric matrix is always non-negative. However this last fact can be proved in an elementary way as follows: the eigenvalues of a real skew-symmetric matrix are purely imaginary (see below) and to every eigenvalue there corresponds the conjugate eigenvalue with the same multiplicity; therefore, as the determinant is the product of the eigenvalues, each one repeated according to its multiplicity, it follows at once that the determinant, if it is not 0, is a positive real number.

The number of distinct terms  in the expansion of the determinant of a skew-symmetric matrix of order  has been considered already by Cayley, Sylvester, and Pfaff. The sequence   is
1, 0, 1, 0, 6, 0, 120, 0, 5250, 0, 395010, 0, …

and it is encoded in the exponential generating function

The latter yields to the asymptotics (for  even)

The number of positive and negative terms are approximatively a half of the total, although their difference takes larger and larger positive and negative values as  increases .

Cross product 
Three-by-three skew-symmetric matrices can be used to represent cross products as matrix multiplications. Consider vectors  and  Then, defining the matrix

 

the cross product can be written as
 

This can be immediately verified by computing both sides of the previous equation and comparing each corresponding element of the results.

One actually has

i.e., the commutator of skew-symmetric three-by-three matrices can be identified with the cross-product of three-vectors.  Since the skew-symmetric three-by-three matrices are the Lie algebra of the rotation group  this elucidates the relation between three-space , the cross product and three-dimensional rotations.  More on infinitesimal rotations can be found below.

Spectral theory 

Since a matrix is similar to its own transpose, they must have the same eigenvalues. It follows that the eigenvalues of a skew-symmetric matrix always come in pairs ±λ (except in the odd-dimensional case where there is an additional unpaired 0 eigenvalue).

Real skew-symmetric matrices are normal matrices (they commute with their adjoints) and are thus subject to the spectral theorem, which states that any real skew-symmetric matrix can be diagonalized by a unitary matrix. Since the eigenvalues of a real skew-symmetric matrix are imaginary, it is not possible to diagonalize one by a real matrix. However, it is possible to bring every skew-symmetric matrix to a block diagonal form by a special orthogonal transformation. Specifically, every  real skew-symmetric matrix can be written in the form  where  is orthogonal and

for real positive-definite . The nonzero eigenvalues of this matrix are ±λk i. In the odd-dimensional case Σ always has at least one row and column of zeros.

More generally, every complex skew-symmetric matrix can be written in the form  where  is  unitary and  has the block-diagonal form given above with  still real positive-definite. This is an example of the Youla decomposition of a complex square matrix.

Skew-symmetric and alternating forms 

A skew-symmetric form  on a vector space  over a field  of arbitrary characteristic is defined to be a bilinear form

such that for all  in 

This defines a form with desirable properties for vector spaces over fields of characteristic not equal to 2, but in a vector space over a field of characteristic 2, the definition is equivalent to that of a symmetric form, as every element is its own additive inverse.

Where the vector space  is over a field of arbitrary characteristic including characteristic 2, we may define an alternating form as a bilinear form  such that for all vectors  in 

This is equivalent to a skew-symmetric form when the field is not of characteristic 2, as seen from

whence

Infinitesimal rotations 

Skew-symmetric matrices over the field of real numbers form the tangent space to the real orthogonal group  at the identity matrix; formally, the special orthogonal Lie algebra. In this sense, then, skew-symmetric matrices can be thought of as infinitesimal rotations.

Another way of saying this is that the space of skew-symmetric matrices forms the Lie algebra  of the Lie group  The Lie bracket on this space is given by the commutator:

It is easy to check that the commutator of two skew-symmetric matrices is again skew-symmetric:

 

The matrix exponential of a skew-symmetric matrix  is then an orthogonal matrix :

The image of the exponential map of a Lie algebra always lies in the connected component of the Lie group that contains the identity element. In the case of the Lie group  this connected component is the special orthogonal group  consisting of all orthogonal matrices with determinant 1. So  will have determinant +1. Moreover, since the exponential map of a connected compact Lie group is always surjective, it turns out that every orthogonal matrix with unit determinant can be written as the exponential of some skew-symmetric matrix. In the particular important case of dimension  the exponential representation for an orthogonal matrix reduces to  the well-known polar form of a complex number of unit modulus. Indeed, if  a special orthogonal matrix has the form

Therefore, putting  and  it can be written

which corresponds exactly to the polar form  of a complex number of unit modulus.

The exponential representation of an orthogonal matrix of order  can also be obtained starting from the fact that in dimension  any special orthogonal matrix   can be written as  where  is orthogonal and S is a block diagonal matrix with  blocks of order 2, plus one of order 1 if  is odd; since each single block of order 2 is also an orthogonal matrix, it admits an exponential form. Correspondingly, the matrix S writes as exponential of a skew-symmetric block matrix  of the form above,  so that  exponential of the skew-symmetric matrix  Conversely, the surjectivity of the exponential map, together with the above-mentioned block-diagonalization for skew-symmetric matrices, implies the block-diagonalization for orthogonal matrices.

Coordinate-free 
More intrinsically (i.e., without using coordinates), skew-symmetric linear transformations on a vector space  with an inner product may be defined as the bivectors on the space, which are sums of simple bivectors (2-blades)  The correspondence is given by the map  where  is the covector dual to the vector ; in orthonormal coordinates these are exactly the elementary skew-symmetric matrices. This characterization is used in interpreting the curl of a vector field (naturally a 2-vector) as an infinitesimal rotation or "curl", hence the name.

Skew-symmetrizable matrix 
An  matrix  is said to be skew-symmetrizable if there exists an invertible diagonal matrix  such that  is skew-symmetric.

See also 
 Cayley transform
 Symmetric matrix
 Skew-Hermitian matrix
 Symplectic matrix
 Symmetry in mathematics

References

Further reading

External links 
 
 
  Fortran Fortran90

Matrices